RMS Andania may refer to:
 , a steamship sunk by World War I German submarine  on 27 January 1918
 , a Cunard Line steamship sunk by World War II German submarine  on 16 June 1940

Ship names